is a Japanese manga artist notable as being the artist of the manga Shion no Ō.

He also created the manga version of Bushido Sixteen.

References

External links

Official website
 Jiro Ando at Media Arts Database 

Manga artists from Tokyo
Year of birth missing (living people)
Living people